Neotogaria thomaswitti is a moth in the family Drepanidae. It was described by Gyula M. László, Gábor Ronkay and László Aladár Ronkay in 2007. It is found in Thailand.

References

Moths described in 2007
Thyatirinae
Moths of Asia